Alanis is a Spanish surname. Notable people with the surname include:
Alma Y. Alanís (born 1980), Mexican electrical engineer and control theorist
Eduardo Alanís (born 1950), Mexican swimmer
Joan Martí i Alanis (1928–2009), former Bishop of Urgell
Juan Alanís (born 1946), Mexican swimmer
Luis Alanís (born 1990), Mexican footballer
Oscar Alanís (born 1986), Mexican footballer
Oswaldo Alanís (born 1989), Mexican footballer
Roberta Lobeira Alanís (born 1979), Mexican visual artist
Tony Alanis, American mixed martial artist
Spanish-language surnames